Saint-Savournin is a commune east of Marseille at the eastern extremity of the Massif de l'Étoile between Cadolive and Mimet in the Bouches-du-Rhône department in the Provence-Alpes-Côte d'Azur region in southern France.

History
Signs of neolithic settlement have been found and extensive evidence has been identified of human habitation during the Gallo-Roman centuries.

Medieval Saint-Savournin was a village that made its living from the land, rearing sheep and goats and cultivating olives.

Population

See also
Communes of the Bouches-du-Rhône department

References

External links
Official website

Communes of Bouches-du-Rhône
Bouches-du-Rhône communes articles needing translation from French Wikipedia